Victorious is an American sitcom on Nickelodeon.

Victorious may also refer to:

Geography
 Victorious cave, a cave near the Dangi Canyon in Aravan, Kyrgyzstan

Naval vessels
 , various Royal Navy ships and a submarine
 , a cargo ship launched in 1918 as Victorious (ID-3514)
 USNS Victorious (T-AGOS-19), an Ocean Surveillance Ship delivered to the Navy in 1991

Books
 The Lost Fleet: Victorious, a military science fiction novel by Jack Campbell
 Victorious, a hapless superhero-for-hire in PS 238
 Captain Victorious, a dim-witted superhero in Ink Pen

Music
 Victorious (Perishers album) or the title song, 2007
 Victorious (Skillet album) or the title song, 2019
 Victorious (Wolfmother album) or the title song (see below), 2016
 Victorious: Music from the Hit TV Show, a soundtrack album, 2011
 "Victorious" (Lina Hedlund song), 2019
 "Victorious" (Panic! at the Disco song), 2015
 "Victorious" (Wolfmother song), 2015

See also
 Victory (disambiguation)
 Victorius (disambiguation)
 Victorinus (disambiguation)